Yuriy Lytvyn  may refer:

 Yuriy Lytvyn (dissident), Ukrainian lyrical and prose writer, journalist, Soviet dissident
 Yuriy Lytvyn (politician), Ukrainian politician, formerly member of Lytvyn Bloc

See also
Lytvyn